Rufus B. Sage (1817–1893) was an American writer, journalist and later mountain man. He is known as the author of Scenes in the Rocky Mountains published in 1846, depicting the life of fur trappers.

Life
Rufus B. Sage was born on March 17, 1817, to the family of Deacon Rufus Sage,  in Cromwell, Connecticut, beforehand known as Middletown. He was the youngest of seven children. His father died when Rufus was 9 which left him in trouble of self-educating and raising. However, due to his vigour and determination Sage was able to self-tutor himself and start working as a printer in the Middleton newspaper.

In fall of 1836 he ventured to Washington County, Ohio, where he became teacher and junior intern at the Marietta Gazette. Thereupon in the spring of 1838, he embarked on an enterprise which took him southward with a cargo of ice. It did not result in mundane earnings yet proved rich in observations; the events he observed in Louisiana and Mississippi made his mind upon the subject of slavery.

After returning to civilization, in Circleville, Ohio, he became well known as a writer, speaker and activist. He organised a debating club, which became very popular, and his press connections brought him in contact with the most prominent citizens of the country. In 1839 he ventured to Columbus, Ohio, and thereupon he engaged in Ohio State Bulletin.

In the early 1840 Sage became a part of political campaign obtaining to promote William Henry Harrison for president. A weekly campaign paper, and later on a daily, was edited and published by him, that did most effective service in bringing about the grand result of electing the whig national ticket by an overwhelming majority. Sage even exposed a democratic plot to smear his candidate.

After the struggles of political campaign his attention was once again drawn to the unknown – so little was known about the territories between Missouri and the Pacific Ocean. Incited by a strong desire to explore the vast region beyond the Missouri frontier, Sage organized a party to explore the west. Despite the fact that his party was scarce, Sage ventured onwards and later joined a party of Indian traders. This period was later described in his famous recollections entitled Scenes in the Rocky Mountains.

In July, 1844, he returned to Columbus and commenced a campaign to support Henry Clay in becoming U.S. president, protesting against the annexation of Texas and the condition of Black slaves. His effort was grand but the election was won by  James K. Polk.

Later on Sage became editor of the Chillicothe Gazette, and worked there until 1845, when returned to visit his home town. In the quiet of his house he prepared his recollections for printing. But his future ideas of travel and adventure had to be changed – his elderly and invalid mother convinced Rufus to marry and settle down which he did and lived for the rest of his life in Cromwell.

Rufus B. Sage died on December 23, 1893.

References

 Bio on Spartacus Educational
 Bio on Genealogyfinds.com

External links
Scenes in the Rocky Mountains (e-book)
Rufus B. Sage Papers. Yale Collection of Western Americana, Beinecke Rare Book and Manuscript Library, Yale University.

1817 births
1893 deaths
Mountain men
Writers from Connecticut
People from Cromwell, Connecticut